Plakoridine A is an alkaloid isolated from the marine sponge Plakortis sp.

References

Pyrrolidine alkaloids
Methyl esters
Phenols